William Halton (19 January 1837 – date of death unknown) was an English first-class cricketer

Halton made his debut in first-class cricket for a combined Yorkshire and Durham cricket team against Nottinghamshire at Stockton-on-Tees in 1858. He made two first-class appearances in 1861 for a United England Eleven against an All England Eleven. In the same season he made his debut for Yorkshire against Surrey at Sheffield, as well as playing for a combined Yorkshire with Stockton-on-Tees cricket team against Cambridgeshire. His final three first-class appearances all came for Yorkshire in 1862. Playing in eight first-class matches, Halton scored 112 runs at an average of 10.18, with a high score of 19 not out.

References

External links

1837 births
Date of death unknown
People from Yarm
Cricketers from County Durham
English cricketers
Yorkshire and Durham cricketers
United All-England Eleven cricketers
Yorkshire cricketers
Yorkshire with Stockton-on-Tees cricketers